The United States Ambassador to the Central African Republic is the ambassador of the United States to the Central African Republic.

Alan W. Lukens (resident at Brazzaville) presented credentials as chargé d'affaires ad interim on August 13, 1960. During Blancke's tenure as non-resident Ambassador to the Central African Republic, the United States Embassy in Bangui was established on February 10, 1961, with Lukens as resident chargé d'affaires ad interim. Ambassador Cooke was commissioned to the Central African Empire.

Ambassadors Extraordinary and Plenipotentiary

Notes
Albert E. Fairchild served as chargé d'affaires ad interim from Dec 1979 to Jul 1981.
Embassy reopened Jan 2005. A. James Panos served as chargé d'affaires ad interim, Jan 2005-Jul 2007.

See also
Central African Republic – United States relations
Foreign relations of the Central African Republic

References

United States Department of State: Background notes on the Central African Republic

External links
United States Department of State: Chiefs of Mission for the Central African Republic
United States Department of State: Central African Republic
United States Embassy in Bangui

Central African Republic

United States